Deportations of Korean adoptees from the United States are an uncommon phenomenon, but have been cause for controversy over many years. Due to the institutional and parental failure to grant and apply for adopted children's citizenship, South Koreans adopted by American families prior to 1983 were left vulnerable to deportations, and many suffered from  a lack of access to other resources American citizens have.

Adoption laws in the United States 
Traditionally, adoptions in the United States were finalized in the state of residence of the adoptive parents, but that system failed to recognize adoptions made abroad and not finalized in U.S. territory. Although states still hold exclusive authority over family law within their territory, the federal government, birth countries, and international law now play a role in the process of international adoption.

The Child Citizenship Act of 2000 also improved the legalization process for international adoptees. This act allowed adoptees who were under the age of 18 years at the time of the Act to get automatic United States citizenship, but those born prior to 1983 were left vulnerable to immigration laws since they were adults by the time of the Act.

The Adoptee Rights Campaign estimates that "112,000 Korean children were adopted by US citizens in the last 60 years. Out of these, 20% of adoptees who are now adults are living in the U.S. without citizenship, in danger of deportation.

Though previous adoption laws allowed many international adoptees to gain citizenship, there are still many who could not benefit because of the age restrictions, such as was the case for adoptees who were adults by the time the Child Citizenship Act of 2000 was put into action. However, there is now a petition for The Adoptee Citizenship Act of 2019 to help those adults who were left vulnerable to deportations. According to the Adoptees for Justice website, " The Adoptee Citizenship Act of 2019 will grant automatic citizenship to all qualifying international adoptees adopted by a U.S. citizen parent, regardless of the date the adoption was finalized or the entering visa." In addition, there are various city resolutions being considered to be sent to Congress. One of the Resolutions includes the Ryu Resolution for Adoptee Citizenship  introduced to the Los Angeles City Council by Councilmember Ryu. This Resolution "would automatically grant citizenship to those adopted by U.S. citizens as children."

Deportation cases

Phillip Clay (Kim Sang-pil) 
Phillip Clay was found abandoned in Seoul in 1981 and legally adopted into an American family in Philadelphia.

After a struggle with drug addiction and a run in with the law, Clay was deported back to Korea in 2012, despite no knowledge of the Korean language or customs, nor without a single contact in the country. Diagnosed in Korea with bipolar disorder, he was shuffled in and out of social agencies and hospitals who could not care for him due to a lack of English speaking staff. In 2017, Clay ended his life jumping from the 14th floor of a building in Seoul.

Adam Crapser 
Adam Crapser was adopted from South Korea by United States citizens in 1979, then readopted by a second family years later. Both families were charged with child abuse, and Crapser was later left alone without United States citizenship. Crapser had run-ins with law, including 3 domestic violence incidents and a charge of contributing to the sexual delinquency of a minor, that led to him not being eligible for a green card after years of searching for his proper adoption documentation.

Crapser now lives in South Korea after being deported from the United States. He filed a lawsuit against one of the biggest international adoption agencies, Holt Children's Services, for negligence in sending thousands of children to the United States and other countries without "accounting for their future citizenship."

D 
D was moved to the United States at the age of five through the now terminated Friends of Children of Various Nations adoption agency. After moving between multiple foster homes, D got involved in gang activity that led him to be deported to South Korea in 2002.

Monte Haines (Ho-kyu Han) 
Born in 1970, Monte Haines was sent to Iowa in 1978. Abused by his adoptive parents, he was shuffled between foster homes for years before being adopted to a family that never secured his citizenship. He would serve honorably in the military and worked as a tattoo artist and a truck driver, claiming that his did not know his driving partner was smuggling drugs when he was arrested. Monte was deported in 2009 with $20 in his pocket and has been struggling to survive in Korea ever since.

Hong 
Hong was among the thousands of Korean children adopted before 1983 and left without U.S. citizenship. He was sexually abused by his adoptive father and abandoned by his adoptive mother shortly after. Hong suffers from anxiety and depression due to these past events, and although he has residency in the United States, his adoptive parents never filed for citizenship. Hong wants to visit Korea, but he cannot apply for a U.S. passport.

Jessica Johnson 
Jessica Johnson was adopted in 1974. Johnson's adoptive father does not recall any social worker seeing to Johnson's adoption in the first 6 months after the adoption took place. As a result, the "correct paperwork was never filed, and she was unable to find employment."

Hyebin Schreiber 
Adopted by her uncle and aunt in Kansas, Hyebin Schreiber arrived in the US in 2014 at 15 years of age from relatives who could not afford to care for her. Her uncle, retired Army Lt. Col. Patrick Schreiber spent much of 2013 and 2014 deployed to Afghanistan, and was unaware that he would need to formally apply for naturalization prior to her 16th birthday to qualify. After a protracted court battle, the 10th Circuit Court of Appeals ruled in 2019 that she must return to Korea.

In popular culture 
Blue Bayou, a film written and directed by Justin Chon, depicts a Korean-American man who was adopted by a white family and is at risk for deportation because his parents did not file for his citizenship. The movie is based on true stories about interracial adoption, which is related to the Child Citizenship Act of 2000.

References 

Adoption in South Korea
Adoption in the United States
Asian-American-related controversies
Deportation from the United States
International adoption